Argyresthia illuminatella is a moth of the  family Yponomeutidae. It is found in most Europe, except Ireland, Great Britain, Portugal, Fennoscandia, Hungary, Slovenia and Greece.

The wingspan is 9.5-10.5 mm. Adults are on wing from the end of April to June. There is one generation per year.

The larvae feed on Abies alba. They initially feed on the buds and then mine part of the stem below which they overwinter. The larva general attack lateral twigs.

References

Moths described in 1839
Argyresthia
Moths of Europe